Jennifer M. "Jen" Seelig (born 1969/1970) is a former Democratic member of the Utah State House of Representatives, who represented the 23rd District from 2006 to 2014.  She lives in Salt Lake City. She is currently working in the Salt Lake City Mayor's Office as the Director of Community Relations.

Early life and education
Seelig has a bachelor's degree from the University of Louisville and an MPA from the University of Utah.

Political career
Representative Seelig was elected November 6, 2012.  During the 2014 General Session, she served as the Minority Leader for the House Democrats. She also served on the House Law Enforcement and Criminal Justice Committee, and the House Political Subdivisions Committee.

2014 Sponsored Legislation

Representative Seelig did not floor sponsor any legislation during 2014.

Pivotal Legislation
During the 2014 General Session, Representative Seelig ran a few bills that are considered "pivotal". HB 90, the Commission on Women in the Economy, received much attention from the media and from Utah citizens. HB 157, Rape Kit Processing Amendments, passed, but was open to much debate on the floor.

References

External links
Utah House of Representatives - Jennifer M. Seelig 'official UT House profile
Project Vote Smart - Jennifer M. 'Jen' Seelig profileFollow the Money'' - Jen Seelig
2006 campaign contributions

Information on bills

Living people
Democratic Party members of the Utah House of Representatives
University of Utah alumni
University of Louisville alumni
Women state legislators in Utah
Politicians from Salt Lake City
21st-century American politicians
21st-century American women politicians
Year of birth missing (living people)
1960s births